The International Society for Antiviral Research (ISAR) is a scientific society that focuses on the discovery and clinical application of antiviral agents.  It was founded in 1987 to encourage the exchange of information and collaborative research on the development of antiviral, biological and chemical agents.  

ISAR sponsors the International Conference on Antiviral Research (ICAR), held yearly since 1988 when the second ICAR occurred in Williamsburg, Virginia.  ISAR also provides scientific information through peer-reviewed scientific journals and administers several international awards.  

, the president of the society was Johan Neyts and the president-elect was Kara Carter. Johan Neyts was succeeded as president by Kara Carter, and the president-elect for 2020-2022 became Katherine Seley-Radtke.

Founding
The foundation for the International Society for Antiviral Research (ISAR) was laid at meetings held in Rotterdam, Netherlands (April 30 – May  3, 1985) and in Il Ciocco, Italy (May 10-23, 1987) by NATO.
The society, in the persons of William M. Shannon, Earl R. Kern, and Richard J. Whitley registered articles of incorporation in the United States in the state of Alabama, on May 14, 1987. The society's stated purpose was "the promotion and advancement of scientific knowledge in the area of antiviral scientific research".

The original Board of Directors of ISAR included Alfons Billiau (KU Leuven, Leuven, Belgium), Erik De Clercq (Rega Institute, KU Leuven), A. Kirk Field (Squibb Institute for Medical Research, Princeton, New Jersey), George J. Galasso (National Institutes of Health (U.S.)), Earl R. Kern (University of Utah, Salt Lake City, Utah), William M. Shannon (Southern Research Institute, Birmingham, Alabama), and Richard J. Whitley (University of Alabama at Birmingham). Richard Whitley became the first president of ISAR, serving from 1988-1990, with De Clercq as president elect.

Conferences
The International Conference on Antiviral Research (ICAR) has been held every year since 1988. Its location circulates between the east coast of the United States, the west coast of the US, and the rest of the world, reflecting the distribution of its members. Locations have included Europe, Asia,   Africa   and Australia as well as the USA.

It is generally agreed that the second ICAR was a meeting held in Williamsburg, Virginia in 1988, which was advertised as such.

Neither the Rotterdam meeting (1985) nor the Italy meeting (1987) was identified at the time as "the first" International Conference for Antiviral Research (ICAR).  Since then, each meeting has been described as the first ICAR meeting by different proponents.
George Galasso and others consider Rotterdam the first meeting because at that meeting Galasso, Erik De Clercq and Alfons Billiau discussed formation of a Society and decided to approach Earl Kern and Richard Whitley.
Erik De Clercq has emphasized the 1987 NATO meeting at Il Ciocco because ideas for both ISAR and ICAR were developed there.

Publications
 Antiviral Research, established 1981.
 Antiviral Chemistry and Chemotherapy, established January 1990.
 Antiviral Therapy, established 1996.
 ISAR NEWS (Newsletter of the International Society for Antiviral Research)

Awards given
 ISAR Award of Excellence, awarded intermittently: William Prusoff, 1988; Gertrude Elion, 1991; Erik De Clercq, 1998; Richard J. Whitley, 1998
 Gertrude Elion Memorial Award (2000-)
 William Prusoff Young Investigator Award (2001-)
 Antonín Holý Memorial Award (2014-)
 Women in Science Speaker Award, (2017-)

Presidents 
 Richard J. Whitley 1988-1990  
 Erik De Clercq 1990-1992
 George J. Galasso 1992-1994
 Hugh J. Field 1994-1996
 Earl R. Kern 1996-1998
 John C. Martin 1998-2000
 Karen K. Biron 2000-2002
 John C. Drach 2002-2004
 John A. Secrist III 2004-2006
 Christopher McGuigan 2006-2008
 Amy K. Patick 2008-2010
 Joseph M. Colacino 2010-2012
 Phillip Furman 2012-2014
 Robert W. Buckheit, Jr. 2014-2016
 José Esté 2016-2018
 Johan Neyts 2018-2020
 Kara Carter 2020-2022
 President elect, 2020-2022, Katherine Seley-Radtke

References 

Organizations based in Birmingham, Alabama
Scientific organizations established in 1987
1987 establishments in Alabama
International scientific organizations